Middle Yanggao Road is a station on Line 9 of the Shanghai Metro. It is located at the intersection of Middle Yanggao Road and Minsheng Road in the city's Pudong New Area.

The station was conceived as part of phase two of Line 9. However, due to construction delays, it opened on 7 April 2010, three months later than the other stations on the same easterly extension. On 30 December 2021 the station became an interchange after the opening of Line 18.

Station Layout

References

Railway stations in Shanghai
Shanghai Metro stations in Pudong
Railway stations in China opened in 2010
Line 9, Shanghai Metro
Line 18, Shanghai Metro